Anthimus I (? – after 536) was a Miaphysite patriarch of Constantinople from 535–536. He was the bishop or archbishop of Trebizond before accession to the Constantinople see. He was deposed by Pope Agapetus I for adhering to Monophysitism (the belief that Jesus had only a divine nature but not a human one) before March 13, 536, and later hidden by Theodora in her quarters for 12 years, until her death.

References

6th-century patriarchs of Constantinople
Bishops of Trebizond
Justinian I